Gurgulyat is a village in Slivnitsa Municipality, Sofia Province,  located in western Bulgaria approximately 10 km south of the town of Slivnitsa.

 the village has a population of 40.

The village is famous for its role in the Serbo-Bulgarian War (1885–1886), when the Bulgarian Army, aided by local residents, prevented the Serbs from reaching Slivnitsa. Most of the village's historical landmarks are dedicated to this event, such as the imposing 20 m-high red-concrete Pantheon-Monument in the Tsarkvishte (Църквище) locality, which features a sculpture of Mother Bulgaria and has an area of around 700 m2.

Other landmarks include the small (60 m-long) gorge of the local river known for its sheer rocks, a fortress and a cave.

Honour
Gurgulyat Peak on Graham Land in Antarctica is named after the village.

Gallery

References

Villages in Sofia Province